The 1957 Washington State Cougars football team was an American football team that represented Washington State College during the 1957 NCAA University Division football season. Led by second-year head coach Jim Sutherland, the team posted a 6–4 overall record, and were 5–3 in the Pacific Coast Conference.

The one-point win over struggling USC was the first time the Cougars had defeated the Trojans in 23 years; in between, the two had tied four times (1936, 1937, 1940, 1950).

Schedule

NFL Draft
Four Cougars were selected in the 1958 NFL Draft, which was thirty rounds (360 selections).

References

External links
 Game program: California at WSC – September 28, 1957
 Game program: Oregon at WSC – October 19, 1957
 Game program: UCLA vs. WSC at Spokane – November 9, 1957
 Game program: Idaho at WSC – November 16, 1957

Washington State
Washington State Cougars football seasons
Washington State Cougars football